The Liberdade River is a river in the states of Mato Grosso and Pará, Brazil.

References

Rivers of Mato Grosso
Rivers of Pará